The Alcoa Edgewater Works was located in Edgewater, Bergen County, New Jersey, United States. The building was built in 1916 for the Alcoa company and added to the National Register of Historic Places on August 10, 1978. The building has since been demolished.

See also
Edgewater Cemetery
National Register of Historic Places listings in Bergen County, New Jersey

References

Edgewater, New Jersey
Industrial buildings completed in 1916
Buildings and structures in Bergen County, New Jersey
Industrial buildings and structures on the National Register of Historic Places in New Jersey
National Register of Historic Places in Bergen County, New Jersey
Alcoa
New Jersey Register of Historic Places
Demolished buildings and structures in New Jersey